Richard Agamiire (born 19 May 1999) is a Ugandan cricketer. In July 2019, Agamire was one of twenty-five players named in the Ugandan training squad, ahead of the 2019 Cricket World Cup Challenge League fixtures in Hong Kong. In November 2019, he was named in Uganda's squad for the Cricket World Cup Challenge League B tournament in Oman. He made his List A debut, for Uganda against Kenya, on 5 December 2019.

In February 2020, he was named in Uganda's team for their three-match Twenty20 International (T20I) series against Qatar. In October 2021, he was named in Uganda's T20I squad for their Group A matches in the 2021 ICC Men's T20 World Cup Africa Qualifier tournament. He made his T20I debut on 19 October 2021, for Uganada against Lesotho. In November 2021, he was named in Uganda's squad for the Regional Final of the 2021 ICC Men's T20 World Cup Africa Qualifier tournament in Rwanda.

References

External links
 

1999 births
Living people
Ugandan cricketers
Uganda Twenty20 International cricketers
Place of birth missing (living people)